is a railway station in the city of Shibata, Niigata, Japan, operated by East Japan Railway Company (JR East).

Lines
Nakaura Station is served by the Uetsu Main Line, and is 21.5 kilometers from the starting point of the line at Niitsu Station.

Station layout
The station consists of one  side platform serving a single bi-directional track. The station formerly had two opposed side platforms connected to the station building by a footbridge. The second platform and footbridge still exist, but the track has been removed. The station is unattended.

History
Nakaura Station opened on 1 July 1953. With the privatization of Japanese National Railways (JNR) on 1 April 1987, the station came under the control of JR East.

Surrounding area

See also
 List of railway stations in Japan

External links

 JR East station information 

Railway stations in Niigata Prefecture
Uetsu Main Line
Railway stations in Japan opened in 1953
Shibata, Niigata